Natrel is a Canadian dairy co-operative based in Montreal, Quebec. The brand specializes in milk without antibiotics and artificial growth hormones and distributes the product throughout Canada.

History 

Natrel was formed in 1990 as the dairy subsidiary of the Agropur agricultural cooperative, headquartered in Longueuil, Quebec. 

In 2012 the company began producing shelf-stable milk in collaboration with Tetra Pak. The first product released in the line was Baboo, a shelf-stable drink aimed towards toddlers. Baboo received criticism for what some people perceived to be an unnecessary product while the company argued that its formulation of milk protein made the drink easily digestible for young children.

In 2015 the company opened a "Milk Bar" cafe in Montreal in collaboration with coffee company Java U. The company opened a second Milk Bar in Toronto in 2016.

Operations
As with other Canadian dairy companies, Natrel's butter production peaks in the spring.

Locations 
 Markham, Ontario
 Longueuil, Quebec
 Quebec City, Quebec
 Amqui, Quebec
 Saint-Bruno-de-Montarville, Quebec
 Sudbury, Ontario
 Ottawa, Ontario
 Chilliwack, British Columbia
 Victoria, British Columbia - Island Dairy
 Delta, British Columbia - Island Dairy

References

External links
 Natrel Official Website
 Agropur Official Website

Dairy products companies of Canada
Food and drink companies established in 1990
Companies based in Longueuil
1990 establishments in Quebec
Canadian companies established in 1990
Agriculture in Quebec